Mihajlović is a common Serbian surname, a patronymic derived from the masculine given name Mihajlo (Michael). It is found throughout former Yugoslavia. It may refer to:

People
Dragomir Mihajlović (b. 1960), guitarist
Dušan Mihajlović (politician) (b. 1948), politician, former Serbian Minister of the Interior 2000–2003
Josif Mihajlović Jurukovski (1887–1941), politician
Milan Mihajlović (b. 1945), composer and conductor
Miloš Mihajlović (b. 1978), pianist
Svetozar Mihajlović (b. 1949), politician

Sports
Bojan Mihajlović (b. 1973), footballer
Boško Mihajlović (b. 1971), footballer
Branislav Mihajlović (1936–1991), former Yugoslav footballer
Branko Mihajlović (b. 1991), footballer
Dragan Mihajlović (b. 1991), Swiss footballer
Dragoslav Mihajlović (1906–1978), former Yugoslav footballer
Dušan Mihajlović (footballer) (b. 1985), Serbian footballer
Ljubomir Mihajlović (b. 1943), former Yugoslav footballer
Nemanja Mihajlović (b. 1996), footballer
Prvoslav Mihajlović (1921–1978), former Yugoslav footballer
Radmilo Mihajlović (b. 1964), former Bosnia and Herzegovina footballer
Siniša Mihajlović, (1969–2022), Serbian football manager and former player
Stefan Mihajlović (b. 1994), footballer
Vesko Mihajlović (b. 1968), footballer
Žarko Mihajlović (1920–1986), football coach

See also
Mihailović
Mijailović
Mihaljić
Mihić

Serbian surnames
Patronymic surnames
ru:Михайлович
Surnames from given names